Hyperlioceras is an extinct genus of cephalopod included in the ammonitid family Graphoceratidae that lived during the Bajocian stage of the Middle Jurassic. The type species is Hyperlioceras discites (Waagen, 18567)

Morphology
The shell of Hyperlioceras is very compressed and involute, with a tall persistent keel and a deep umbilicus.

Biostratigraphic significance
The International Commission on Stratigraphy (ICS) has defined the base of the Bajocian Stage of the Jurassic as the lowest occurrence of the genus Hyperlioceras, at 170.3 ± 1.4 million years ago, which defines base of the Hyperlioceras discites Zone.  This point also marks the end of the preceding Aalenian Stage. The upper boundary of the Bajocian is indicated by the lowest occurrence of the ammonite Parkinsonia (G.) convergens, at about 167.7 Ma, which defines base of Zigzagiceras zigzag Zone.

Distribution
Luxembourg, Saudi Arabia, Spain and the United Kingdom.

Synonyms 

 Braunsella Buckman, 1904
 Braunsina Buckman, 1902
 Darellia
 Darellina Buckman, 1904
 Deltoidoceras Buckman, 1902
 Deltotoceras Buckman, 1904
 Dissoroceras Buckman, 1902
 Hugia Buckman, 1904
 Hyperlioceras (Toxolioceras)
 Lopadoceras Buckman, 1904
 Reynesella
 Reynesia Buckman, 1902
 Toxolioceras

References

 W. Arkell et al., 1957. Mesozoic Ammonoidea; Treatise on Invertebrate Paleontology, Part L.  Geological Society of America and University of Kansas Press. p. L264

Jurassic ammonites
Index fossils
Ammonites of Europe
Bajocian life
Hildoceratoidea
Ammonitida genera